Jadeite, “Jadite” or “Jade-ite” is a type of table and kitchenware made of Jade-green opaque milk glass, popular in the United States in the early to mid-20th century. Similar blue variations called “Delphite” (Delfite, Jeannette Glass) and "Azur-ite" (Anchor Hocking) was also produced for several years. 

McKee Glass introduced their Jade-green colored kitchen and table wear in 1930. Shortly after in 1932, Jeannette Glass began their production of this color glass, in doing so coining the term Jadite. In the mid-1940’s, Jade-ite was produced by Anchor Hocking. Early versions produced by McKee Glass Company and Jeannette Glass Company (both of Jeannette PA) are a type of uranium glass that will glow under UV light.

Jadeite Fire King
The "Jadeite Fire King" brand was first produced by the United States glassware firm Anchor Hocking in the 1940s. Most of Anchor Hocking's output of Jadeite was between 1945 and 1975. A durable product in a fashionable color, it became the most popular product made by Anchor Hocking. 

The glassware's popularity also makes it an affordable and popular collectible today. Reproduction items are produced today by various manufacturers. Fire King Jadeite is still produced in reproduction lines by Anchor Hocking, which designs variations into its reproductions so that they are not mistaken for originals, to maintain the integrity of the genuine status of original Jadeite articles.

Similar products
Jeannette Glassware was a United States manufacturer of green milk glass tableware similar in appearance to Jadeite Fire King.

Kitchenware in other materials, such as aluminum canisters and bread containers, were produced in the mid-20th century in the same shade of Jadeite green, to match the glassware.

See also
Depression glass
Milk glass

References

Collecting
Glass compositions